The Bank of Italy Building is a historic building in Los Angeles, California, USA, known for many years as Giannini Place. It was converted to a hotel in 2018 and currently operates as Hotel Per La.

Location
The building is located on the corner of 7th Street and Olive Street in Downtown Los Angeles.

History
The 12-story building was completed in 1922, and it was dedicated in 1923. It was built as the Los Angeles headquarters of the Bank of Italy, a forerunner to Bank of America founded by Amadeo Giannini. It was designed by the architectural firm Morgan, Walls & Clements, in the Neoclassical architectural style with "Doric columns, ornate golden ceiling and marble floors." The bronze front doors are surrounded by terra cotta sculptures of American coins.

It belonged to the Chetrit Group, until it was acquired by the Sydell Group for US$39 million. From 2015 to 2017, the building was remodeled into the NoMad Los Angeles Hotel, with additional investments from billionaire Ronald Burkle. The hotel opened in 2018, but closed in 2020, due to the COVID-19 pandemic. It reopened in 2022 as the Hotel Per La.

References

External links 
Hotel Per La official website

Buildings and structures in Downtown Los Angeles
Hotel buildings completed in 1922
Neoclassical architecture in California
Hotels in Los Angeles
Hotels established in 2018
Hotels established in 2022